Achille et Déidamie (Achilles and Deidamia) is an opera by the French composer André Campra, first performed at the Académie Royale de Musique (the Paris Opera) on 24 February 1735. It takes the form of a tragédie en musique in a prologue and five acts. The libretto, by Antoine Danchet, is based on the Greek legend of Achilles and Deidamia.

Sources
 Libretto at "Livres baroques"
 Félix Clément and Pierre Larousse Dictionnaire des Opéras, Paris, 1881

Tragédies en musique
Operas by André Campra
French-language operas
Operas
1735 operas